Farewell Moscow is a 1987 Italian drama film directed by Mauro Bolognini. For this film Liv Ullmann was awarded with a David di Donatello for Best Actress. It is based on the life of Russian Jew Ida Nudel.

Cast
 Liv Ullmann as Ida Nudel
 Daniel Olbrychski as Yuli
 Aurore Clément as Elena
 Saverio Vallone
 Carmen Scarpitta
 Francesca Ciardi
 Nino Fuscagni
 Anna Galiena
 Vittorio Amandola

References

External links

1987 films
Italian drama films
1980s Italian-language films
1987 drama films
Films directed by Mauro Bolognini
Films scored by Ennio Morricone
1980s Italian films